Leonardo Adrián Verón (born 22 January 1982) is an Argentine former professional footballer who played as an attacking midfielder. He played for Persita Tangerang in the Indonesia Super League.

References

External links
 
 

1982 births
Living people
Argentine footballers
Association football defenders
Liga 1 (Indonesia) players
Boca Juniors footballers
Kedah Darul Aman F.C. players
Chacarita Juniors footballers
Defensores de Cambaceres footballers
Sportivo Belgrano footballers
Minervén S.C. players
Persih Tembilahan players
Persita Tangerang players
Argentine expatriate footballers
Argentine expatriate sportspeople in Malaysia
Expatriate footballers in Malaysia
Argentine expatriate sportspeople in Venezuela
Expatriate footballers in Venezuela
Argentine expatriate sportspeople in Indonesia
Expatriate footballers in Indonesia
Sportspeople from Buenos Aires Province